Shri Shantadurga Saunsthan is a private temple complex belonging to the Goud Saraswat Brahman Samaj located   from Panaji at the foothill of Kavalem village in Ponda Taluka, Goa, India. 
 
Shrimad Swamiji of Shri Kavale Math is spiritual head Of Shree Shantadurga Saunsthan, Kavale (Shrimat Shivananda Saraswati Swami Gauḍapādāchārya of Shri Kavale Math is spiritual chief Of Shree Shantadurga Saunsthan).

Shree Shantadurga is the Kuldevi (family deity) of many Goud Saraswat Brahman.
On 4 December 2016, (Margashirsh Shuddh Panchmi). Shree Shantadurga Devasthan, Kavale has completed its 450th year of existence.

Deity

The temple is dedicated to Shantadurga, the goddess who mediates between Vishnu and Shiva. The deity is also called 'Santeri' colloquially. 
Purana talks of a battle between Shiva and Vishnu The battle was so fierce that the God Brahma prayed to Goddess AdishaktiParvati to intervene, which she did in the form of Shantadurga.  Shantadurga placed Vishnu on her right hand and Shiva on her left hand and settled the fight.

Shantadurga is holding two serpents, one in each hand, representing Vishnu and Shiva.
Shrimat Shivananda Saraswati Swami Gauḍapādāchārya of Shri Kavale Math is spiritual head of Shree Shantadurga Saunsthan, Kavale.

Temple
The original temple at Quelossim (Keloshi) in Salcete was destroyed by the Portuguese in 1566. The goddess was shifted to Kavalem and worship was continued there. The site on which the original Temple of Shantadurga stood at Quelossim (Keloshi) is known as "Deoolbhata" and it is in the possession of the Shree Shantadurga Saunsthan Committee, Kavale.
The current temple was constructed during the reign of Maratha Empire Chattrapati Shahu Maharaj of Satara during the period from 1713 AD to 1738 AD. Naroram Mantri (Rege) originally from Kochara village in the Vengurla Taluka,(Konkan) was a Mantri (Minister) in Chattrapati Shahu Maharaj (Grandson of Chh.Shivaji Maharaj & Son of Dharmaveer Chh.Sambhaji Maharaj) Ashtapradhan Mandal at Satara Due to his efforts, the village of Kavalem was bequeathed to the Temple by Shrimant Baji Rao I Peshwa in 1738.
The Temple reconstruction started around 1730s.

The temple complex is on the slope of the foothills of a mountain chain, surrounded by lush vegetation. There is a main temple and three smaller temples of other deities which have been built on three sides of the temple. The temple consists of a collection of pyramidal roofs with a dome. The pillars and floors are made of Kashmir stone. The temple has a huge tank, a Deep Jyoti Stambh and agrashalas (guest houses).

Many renovations have been completed over the years to the main temple and the temples of the other deities as well as to the agrashala. The temple has recently banned entry of foreigners, into the temple citing objectionable dressing and conduct as the reason.

Architectural styles
This Temple is built in Saraswat Architectural style.
Its pyramidical shape 'shikaras' rising on the roofs of the facade (entrance hall) and the 'Sabhamandap' (the main hall), its roman-arched windows, some of which have the stained-glass window panes of deep red, yellow, blue, green colours, its chandeliers, its gate posts, balustraded flat dome, the maroon-peach-white colour paint of the temple gives the temple a serene beautiful look.

The highlight of the temple is its golden palanquin (palkhi) in which the deity is carried on festive occasions (only 5 Mahapanchmi).

Gallery

See also

Notes

External links

Temples of Goa
Shri Shantadurga Temple, Kavalem
Shree Shantadurga Devi, Kavlem, Phonda, Goa Official Website
Photo of Shanta Durga Temple
Other Durga-Shantadurga Temples
Navadurga Temples

Durga temples
Hindu temples in South Goa district